Edwin Sandys may refer to:

 Edwin Sandys (bishop) (1519–1588), Bishop of London, Worcester, Archbishop of York
 Sir Edwin Sandys (died 1629) (1561–1629), founder of the colony of Virginia, son of the archbishop
 Sir Edwin Sandys (died 1608) (–1608), English politician
 Sir Edwin Sandys (died 1623) (1591–1623), English politician
 Edwin Sandys (Parliamentarian) (1612-1642) 
 Edwin Sandys (MP for Worcestershire) (1659–1699), British politician
 Edwin Sandys, 2nd Baron Sandys (1726–1797)

See also
Sandys (surname)